Oba Falolu Dosunmu (died September 2, 1949) was a former fisherman who was also a member of the House of Dosunmu (Docemo), and who succeeded Oba Eshugbayi Eleko as Oba of Lagos from 1932 to 1949.

Ascendancy
Upon Oba Eshugbayi Eleko's death in 1932, Sanusi Olusi, who stepped aside as Oba for Eshugbayi Eleko's triumphant return, put himself up for the Obaship and was backed by the chiefs (such as Oniru, Ojora, Obanikoro, and Modile) who were installed when Eleko was exiled in Oyo. In the opposite camp (often referred to as "The Eshugbayi Faction") were mostly members of the Jamat Muslims, Ilu Committee, and NNDP such as Herbert Macaulay, Chief Oluwa, Eric O. Moore, Horatio Jackson, Mobolaji Bank-Anthony, Dr. Crispin Adeniyi-Jones who supported Falolu Dosunmu's candidacy.

To prevent Sanusi Olusi's re-emergence as Oba, the Eshugbayi faction went against the custom of waiting between the death of an Oba and the installation of a new one, and elected Falolu Dosunmu on October 30, 1932, and asked the British colonial government for official recognition. After recognition, Falolu was installed Oba of Lagos on November 3, 1932.

Election protests by Sanusi Olusi's camp and the Ward Price Commission
Sanusi Olusi's supporters opposed Falolu's rushed elections and when the dispute persisted into 1933, Governor Donald Cameron set up the Ward-Price Commission to review the Oba selection process and to determine whether the process needed modification. The commission initially found that there was no order of selection among the four group of Lagos chiefs but this finding was unpopular with the Lagos public. Faced with a more tense situation, Governor Cameron found a resolution with the appointment of a Selection Committee headed by Mr. Whiteley which decided by a majority (4 in favor of Falolu and 2 for Sanusi Olusi) to recognize Falolu Dosunumu as Oba of Lagos.

Falolu's Reforms
Falolu sought to strengthen the influence and the Obaship institution. Under his reign, the practice of official Obaship archives commenced with the recording of native laws, customs, and meetings between the Oba, chiefs, and the government. Oba Falolu refused to attend meetings at the commissioner of the colony's office and demanded that all future meetings be held at his palace or through an intermediary. He refused to stand up when addressing British officers and pushed back vigorously on the commissioner of the colony's assumption that he was under the commissioner's directive.

Death
Oba Falolu Dosunmu died on September 2, 1949, and was buried at Iga Idunganran.

References

People from Lagos
1949 deaths
Obas of Lagos
Nigerian royalty
20th-century Nigerian people
History of Lagos
Yoruba monarchs
Burials in Lagos State
People from colonial Nigeria
Ologun-Kutere family
Residents of Lagos